Vaughtia jucunda is a species of sea snail, a marine gastropod mollusk in the family Muricidae, the murex snails or rock snails.

Description
The length of the shell attains 12 mm.

Distribution
This marine species occurs off Port Elizabeth, South Africa.

References

 Thiele, J. (1925). Gastropoden der Deutschen Tiefsee-Expedition. II Teil. Wissenschaftliche Ergebnisse der Deutschen Tiefsee-Expedition auf dem Dampfer "Valdivia" 1898-1899. 17(2): 35-382, pls 13-46
 Lussi M. (2012) Description of three new species of Vaughtia from off the Eastern Cape, South Africa with a revision of the genus (Gastropoda: Prosobranchia: Muricidae) from Southern Madagascar. Malacologia Mostra Mondiale 76: 5-13.
 Houart, R.; Kilburn, R. N. & Marais, A. P. (2010). Muricidae. pp. 176-270, in: Marais A.P. & Seccombe A.D. (eds), Identification guide to the seashells of South Africa. Volume 1. Groenkloof: Centre for Molluscan Studies. 376 pp

External links
 Houart, R. (1995). Pterymarchia n. gen. and Vaughtia n. gen., two new muricid genera (Gastropoda: Muricidae: Muricinae and Ocenebrinae). Apex. 10 (4): 127-136

Ocenebrinae
Gastropods described in 1925